The Cutting Edge film series consists of American sports-romance films, including one theatrical film and three made-for-television movies which were later released straight-to-home video media. Based on characters and an original story written by Tony Gilroy, the plot centers around the unlikely pairing of differing ice sports athletes, for Olympic title pairs figure skating. Beginning as nothing more than argumentative team collaborations, the featured couples become romantically involved.

The first film, characterized as a romantic comedy in genre, was met with mixed critical reception. The acting was praised, though some identified the mashup of genres as jarring while stating, "There is essentially not an original moment in the entire film, and yet it's skillfully made and well-acted."

The three made-for-television sequels, which are categorically romantic dramas, were met with varying degrees of mixed critical reception with a common critique being that they are derivatives of the original film. Going for the Gold was criticized for being "geared toward teens", while being  praised for the leads; Chasing the Dream was praised for being "actually kind of fun", with positive reception for Francia Raisa's acting and the film's direction, choreography, and cinematography; while the final installment, Fire and Ice, was met with mixed reception: criticism pointed at being perceived as a cash-grab, while praise was received for believable on-screen chemistry between the leads and for a "touching story".

Films

The Cutting Edge (1992)

Talented and confident figure-skating prodigy Kate Moseley is denied a gold medal at the 1988 Olympics, after missing her footing and taking a fall. In the following months, as she drives away partner after partner, her coach named Anton searches for a replacement so that she will be ready for the next Olympic games. Anton decides to attempt to pair her with an unorthodoxed teammate; an arrogant former-Olympic hockey star named, Doug Dorsey. Reluctantly working together, they soon realize that the two athletes had briefly encountered years before. The duo's combative collaboration begins to turn into chemistry. As they grow closer in the rink, their relationship becomes romantic in their personal lives.

The Cutting Edge: Going for the Gold (2006)

Jackie Dorsey is the daughter of 1992 Winter Olympics Gold medalists, Kate Moseley and Doug Dorsey. Growing up under their tutelage, Jackie develops dreams of her own and decides that she will compete and win her own Olympic gold medal. Her dreams seem to come to an abrupt end, after suffering a career threatening injury. As she recovers and strives to overcome her traumatic experience, she is paired with a new skating partner named Alex Harrison. Talented in his own right, the couple find that their respective stubbornness and pride creates a difficult environment. As they begin to trust each other, their relationship changes and becomes romantic in nature. Working together their dreams of becoming Olympic champions, gets closer to becoming a reality.

The Cutting Edge: Chasing the Dream (2008)

When talented Zack Conroy's pair-skating partner suffers an injury, he is tasked with finding someone to replace her. He accidentally discovers the skilled female hockey player, Alejandra "Alex" Delgado. Though Alex has not had figure skating lessons since childhood, she proves to be a quick study. With the help of coach Jackie Dorsey, Zack and Alex learn to work through their differences, in life and on the rink, so they can reach their goal of competing in Paris.

The Cutting Edge: Fire and Ice (2010)

The career of figure skating all-star, Alejandra "Alex" Delgado, comes to a standstill after her partner and boyfriend, Zack Conroy, suffered an injury. As their athletic relationship diminishes, so too does their relationship. Following their breakup and experiencing heartbreak, Alex turns to working as an ice skating teacher. Her competitive nature and passion for pairs figure skating rekindles, when an unexpected opportunity arises. Egotistical "bad boy" of speed skating James McKinsey, whose uncontrolled personal life gets him banned from the national team, works with his promotion team to start a career in pairs figure skating. Tempted by the chance at another world title, Alex agrees to work with him. Initial practices prove that their personalities are opposites, though their work-ethic is a match. As they become more familiar with each other, their argumentative clashes escalate until their tumultuous determination becomes personal. As their relationship becomes romantic, they work even harder to reach their life's goals of a championship title.

Main cast and characters

Additional crew and production details

Reception

Box office and financial performance

Critical and public response

References 

American sports drama films
American ice hockey films
Films about Olympic figure skating